The small-eyed rabbitfish (Hydrolagus affinis) is a species of fish in the family Chimaeridae. It has very wide distribution almost everywhere in Northern Atlantic at depths from 300 to 2,410 m, being most common below 1,000 m. Its total length ranges from 32 to 147 cm. It has a short nose with a blunt tip. The small mouth is located on the lower part of the head and has thick lips. Its back slopes gradually and ends in a fine tail.

Rabbitfish were recently caught off of the coast of Greenland and were taken to do research on the various parasites in and on the fish. Nine parasites were recorded for the H. Affinis species. The nine parasites included Trichodina, Chimaericolidea, Calicotyle, Multicalyx, Chimaerohemecus, Gonocerca phycidis, Gyrocotyle abyssicola, Gyrocotyle major, and Lernaeopodina longibrachia. They were found in the urinary system, gills, cloaca, gullblader and bile ducts, heart, stomach and oesophagus, inetstines, and eyes.

References

small-eyed rabbitfish
Fish of the North Atlantic
small-eyed rabbitfish